Cartmel Priory church serves as the parish church of Cartmel, Cumbria, England (formerly in Lancashire).

Priory
The priory was founded in 1190 by William Marshal, created 1st Earl of Pembroke, intended for a community of the Augustinian Canons regular and was dedicated to Saint Mary the Virgin and Saint Michael.

To support the new house, William granted it the whole fief of the district of Cartmel. It was first colonised by a prior and twelve canons sent from Bradenstoke Priory in Wiltshire.

14th century
Between 1327 and 1347 a chapel with four traceried windows was provided by Lord Harrington in the south choir aisle; his tomb is in the building. The gatehouse, which apart from the church itself is the only surviving structure of the medieval priory, was built between 1330 and 1340.

15th and 16th centuries
In the 15th century extensive work was undertaken, in part due to damage (believed to be from natural causes) in the northern part of the church. In the east end of the church, the early lancet windows were replaced by one huge window of stained glass, misericords were installed in the choir, and the tower was extended. Unusually, the extension to the tower sits at a 45-degree angle to the base on which it rests, a feature believed to be unique in England. Work on the building continued intermittently into the 16th century, when the choir screen was constructed.

The 25 misericords date from 1440, and are of an exceptional quality. They include representation of the Green man, which with its three heads sprouting foliage is said to symbolize the devil.

Dissolution

The priory was surrendered by its then community of ten canons at the Dissolution of the Monasteries in 1536. An effect of the Pilgrimage of Grace was that the community was reinstated, one of perhaps 16 such cases.   The prior, Richard Preston, had not thrown in his lot with resistance, but had fled to the Crown forces under Edward Stanley, 3rd Earl of Derby. He was to secure a parochial living to supplement his Crown pension.  Others had a different fate. With the failure of the rising, as in other similar cases there came  a brutal end for some, the subprior and several of the canons being hanged, along with ten villagers who had supported them.

The priory's ancient responsibility for providing a Guide over Cartmel Sands was transferred to the Duchy of Lancaster. Thomas Hogeson was appointed by the Duchy as the first official guide to the sands on 29 January 1548.

Parish Church

The Dissolution commissioners had instructions to "pull down to the ground all the walls of the churches, stepulls, cloysters, fraterys, dorters, chapter howsys" and all the rest. The materials were then to be sold for the profit of the Crown. These habitual procedures would have meant Cartmel Priory's church being demolished along with the rest of its buildings. However, in this case the founder William Marshal had given an altar within the church to the village, and provided a priest along with it. The villagers petitioned to be allowed to keep the church as it was their only place of worship, and this was granted.

17th century
Despite the villagers' being allowed to keep the church, the lead was stripped from the nave, and until 1618 when George Preston, a landowner at nearby Holker Hall, provided considerable finances to allow the roof to be reinstated, the villagers actually worshipped in the choir, rather than the nave of the church. In 1643 some Roundhead troops stayed in the village, stabling their horses in the church. Bullet holes from this time are still visible in the southwest door of the nave.

The nave was used after the Dissolution as a prison and later between 1624 and 1790 as a grammar school.

19th and 20th centuries
By 1830 the church was in need of repair again, and underwent a restoration, which has been described in the Edge Guide as "more enthusiastic than sympathetic".  In 1850 a new panelled ceiling was inserted in the central part of the church, forming the belfry floor.

A further restoration was carried out in 1867 by E. G. Paley. The restoration was described in the Westmorland Gazette of 28 September 1867 The old seats and galleries have been removed from the nave and transepts, which have been reseated with new benches of oak. The plaster and whitewash of succeeding centuries has been entirely taken off an cleaned from the walls, pillars, and arches of the church. The ancient massive open timbered roof of oak, which for centuries has been hid behind a plastered ceiling, has been uncovered and restored. The whole of the windows have been reglazed with Hartley’s cathedral glass. A new font, pulpit and reading-desk of stone have been added to the church. The font is square with moulded panels, carved and drapered work, and marble shaft. The pulpit is of octagonal design, supported by marble shafts, on three sides are moulded panels containing carved heads representing our Saviour, St. Peter, and St. Paul. A new organ has been erected in the town choir.

In 1923, the gatehouse became a museum,  and was used for exhibitions, and meetings, before being presented in 1946  to the National Trust who continue to operate it as the "Cartmel Priory Gatehouse".

The church is an active Anglican parish church in the deanery of Windermere, the archdeaconry of Westmorland and Furness, and the diocese of Carlisle. Its benefice is united with those of St Mary, Allithwiate, St Peter, Field Broughton, St John the Baptist, Flookburgh, St Paul, Grange-over-Sands, Grange Fell Church, Grange-Over-Sands, and St Paul, Lindale, to form the benefice of Cartmel Peninsula. The church is recorded in the National Heritage List for England as a designated Grade I listed building.

Organ
The pipe organ was installed in 1867 by F. Jardine of Manchester. The inauguration was recorded in the Westmorland Gazette of 28 September 1867: The organ which has been built by Mr. Jardine of Manchester, had its capabilities tested by Mr. Stevens of Holy Trinity Church, Manchester. It had been intended where the rubric leaves it optional, whether any part shall be “said or sung” to have our beautiful church service sung by one of the finest choirs of Manchester, and the organ presided at by one of the most accomplished amateur players in the North of England. Arrangements having been made by Mr. Jardine for the attendance of Mr. Joule and his choir of St. Peter’s; but the Bishop has so strong an objection to musical services, and such strong fears of its effects on worshippers, that out of deference to his opinion the people of Cartmel were deprived of what would certainly have been, and what they had long been anticipating as a good treat. 

The organ was rebuilt in 1969 by Rushworth and Dreaper of Liverpool and in 2005 by Principal Pipe Organs. A specification of the organ can be found on the National Pipe Organ Register.

Bells
The church tower contains a ring of 6 bells. Four are new, dating from 1987 by Eijsbouts, with an old set of 4 bells (2 from 1661 and then 1726 and 1729) making an old 6 when combined with the 2 smaller bells of 1932 by John Taylor and Co.

Burials in the priory
John Harington, 1st Baron Harington
John Harington, 2nd Baron Harington

See also

Grade I listed churches in Cumbria
Listed buildings in Lower Allithwaite
List of ecclesiastical works by E. G. Paley
List of ecclesiastical works by Paley and Austin
List of English abbeys, priories and friaries serving as parish churches

References

External links

1536 disestablishments in England
Augustinian monasteries in England
Monasteries in Cumbria
Monasteries in Lancashire
Church of England church buildings in Cumbria
Grade I listed churches in Cumbria
Tourist attractions in Cumbria
Religious organizations established in the 1190s
Christian monasteries established in the 12th century
Paley and Austin buildings
1190 establishments in England
Monasteries dissolved under the English Reformation
Cartmel